The school was established in 1952 and it is managed by the Pvt. Aided. The school was found by T. A. Ramalingam Chettiar was an Indian lawyer, politician, member of parliament and businessman from the Indian state of Tamil Nadu. After his death, his heirs established the T.A. Ramalingam Chettiar Trust in his memory. The trust runs a Higher Secondary School named after him. The trust also sponsors a number of scholarships and endowments in various educational institutions in Coimbatore.

History
 Year of Establishment: 1953
 Year of Recognition Secondary: 1958
 Year of Recognition Higher Secondary: 1980

References

Sources 
1. https://www.udiseplus.gov.in/#/home

2. U-DISE

External links

High schools and secondary schools in Tamil Nadu
Schools in Coimbatore